The Q22, registered as the P.J. O'Shea Stakes is a Brisbane Racing Club Group 2 Thoroughbred horse race held under weight for age conditions, for horses aged three years old and upwards, over a distance of 2,200 metres at Doomben Racecourse, Brisbane, Australia during the Queensland Winter Racing Carnival. Total prizemoney is A$400,000.

History

The inaugural running of the race as the P.J. O'Shea Stakes was in 1947. The race was named after Patrick O'Shea, the Queensland Turf Club's treasurer in the early 1900s and raced horses in Brisbane for 35 years.

The race is considered a major prep leadup race to the Brisbane Cup.

Name

1947–1971 - P. J. O'Shea Stakes
 1972 - Sir Winston Churchill Stakes
1973–2009 - P. J. O'Shea Stakes
2010–2016 - Eagle Farm Cup
2017–2019 - P. J. O'Shea Stakes
2021 onwards - Q22

Distance

1947–1956 -  miles
 1957 -  miles 
1958–1968 - 1 mile  furlongs
1969–1972 -  miles 
1973–1982 – 2200 metres
 1983 – 2232 metres
 1984 – 2200 metres
1985–2006 – 2400 metres
2007 onwards - 2200 metres

Grade
1947–1978 - Principal race
1979 onwards - Group 2 race

Venue
Due to track reconstruction of Eagle Farm Racecourse for the 2014–15 racing season the event was transferred to Doomben Racecourse. With the poor state of the Eagle Farm Racecourse the event in 2017 was moved with the Queensland Oaks again to Doomben Racecourse and in 2018 the meeting was moved to the Sunshine Coast.

 2015, 2017, 2019 - Doomben Racecourse
 2018 - Corbould Park Racecourse

Winners

 2019 - Kenedna
 2018 - Egg Tart
 2017 - Single Gaze
 2016 - Race not held
 2015 - Werther
 2014 - Moriarty
 2013 - Quintessential
 2012 - Lights Of Heaven
 2011 - Glass Harmonium
 2010 - Triple Honour
 2009 - Scenic Shot
 2008 - Scenic Shot
 2007 - Pentathon
 2006 - Mahtoum
 2005 - Natural Blitz
 2004 - Pentastic
 2003 - Maguire
 2002 - Hey Pronto
 2001 - Yippyio
 2000 - Ken's Joy
 1999 - Sharscay
 1998 - Intergaze
 1997 - Pakaraka Star
 1996 - The Phantom Chance
 1995 - Rough Habit
 1994 - Full Suit
 1993 - Dark Ksar
 1992 - Mountain Rule
 1991 - Magnolia Hall/Spring Thaw
 1990 - Shuzohra
 1989 - Card Shark
 1988 - Lord Hybrow
 1987 - Our Silver Elm
 1986 - Rising Fear
 1985 - Our Boyfriend
 1984 - Godarchi
 1983 - Prince Majestic
 1982 - Shamrock
 1981 - Four Crowns
 1980 - Iko 
 1979 - Belmura Lad 
 1978 - Tod Bay
 1977 - Ngawyni 
 1976 - Balmerino
 1975 - Nourishing
 1974 - Passetreul
 1973 - Baghdad Note 
 1972 - Tails 
 1971 - Bluelough
 1970 - Roman Consul
 1969 - Roman Consul
 1968 - Swift Peter
 1967 - Striking Force
 1966 - Striking Force
 1965 - Fair Patton
 1964 - Count Radiant
 1963 - Oakland
 1962 - Rural Loch
 1961 - Tulloch 
 1960 - Tulloch
 1959 - Caesar
 1958 - Sailor's Guide
 1957 - Redcraze
 1956 - Redcraze
 1955 - Surprise Ending
 1954 - Gallant Archer
 1953 - Hydrogen 
 1952 - Spellman
 1951 - Voussoir
 1950 - Persist
 1949 - Dark Marne
 1948 - On Cor
 1947 - Russia 

Notes:
 Race meeting scheduled for 4 June 2016 was abandoned due to Eagle Farm's course deemed unsafe for racing after early morning track inspection due to continuous overnight rain.
 Dead heat
 Winners in italics that have won the P.J. O'Shea Stakes–Brisbane Cup double

See also
 List of Australian Group races
 Group races

References

Sport in Brisbane
Horse races in Australia